Anton Alexander Peterlin (born April 4, 1987) is an American soccer player who plays as a midfielder, having previously played for San Francisco Seals, Ventura County Fusion, Everton, Plymouth Argyle and Walsall.

Career

Amateur and college
Peterlin attended Lowell High School, where he was twice named the Most Valuable Player of San Francisco's public high school league. After graduating, he enrolled at the University of California, Santa Cruz, before transferring to California Polytechnic State University, where he majored in biology. At Cal Poly Peterlin was a Big West All-Conference First Team selection and an All-NSCAA Far West Region Third Team selection in his senior year.

During his collegiate off-seasons Peterlin played for the San Francisco Seals and Ventura County Fusion in the USL Premier Development League. Graham Smith, coach of the Fusion, recommended Peterlin to David Moyes, manager of Premier League club Everton. After impressing during a ten-day trial during the 2008–09 season, Everton announced on July 6, 2009, that they would sign him to a one-year contract. Peterlin rejected offers from Major League Soccer clubs Chicago Fire and San Jose Earthquakes to join Everton.

Professional
Peterlin made his Everton debut on July 10, 2009, in a pre-season friendly defeat to Bury. He played in eight reserve team games for the Toffees, but never made a first team appearance in any competition. He was released upon his contract expiry in June 2010 and he was offered a trial by Plymouth Argyle manager Peter Reid, a former Everton player.

Peterlin was successful with his trial and signed a one-year contract with Plymouth Argyle on July 27, 2010. He made his full professional debut on August 7, 2010, in Plymouth's 1–0 opening day victory over Southampton. Having made 14 appearances in all competitions during the 2010–11 season, Peterlin was one of nine first team players released by the club. He joined Walsall on trial in July 2011, and went on to sign a one-year contract after impressing their manager Dean Smith. He made his debut for Walsall on August 9, 2011, coming on as a substitute for Claude Gnakpa in a 3–0 League Cup defeat against Middlesbrough. Having left Walsall, Peterlin trialled with Hearts and Colorado Rapids.

Personal life
Born in the United States to a Danish mother and Slovenian father, Peterlin holds dual citizenship in the U.S. and Denmark, which eliminated the need to secure a work permit. His mother Anne moved from Denmark to the United States to attend the University of San Francisco on a tennis scholarship. Peterlin's brother Sebastian is a rower at Stanford University.

Career statistics

References

External links

Interview with Marin FC

1987 births
Living people
American expatriate sportspeople in Denmark
American people of Danish descent
American people of Slovenian descent
American soccer players
Association football midfielders
Boldklubben af 1893 players
Cal Poly Mustangs men's soccer players
California Polytechnic State University alumni
Danish people of Slovenian descent
English Football League players
Everton F.C. players
Hellerup IK players
Lowell High School (San Francisco) alumni
Plymouth Argyle F.C. players
San Francisco Seals (soccer) players
Soccer players from San Francisco
UC Santa Cruz Banana Slugs men's soccer players
USL League Two players
Ventura County Fusion players
Walsall F.C. players
American expatriate sportspeople in England
Expatriate footballers in England
American expatriate soccer players
Expatriate footballers in Denmark